In Finnish mythology and lore, a menninkäinen is believed to be a leprechaun-like inhabitant of the forests. Fairy tale depictions often involve riddling, dominance struggles and favors elicited. Menninkäinen were probably originally thought to be spirits of dead people, but folklore about them has changed during time, and they turned to be something else.

In modern usage, the word is usually used to mean goblins, hobgoblins and gnomes. Not all Finnish words for the little folk have an English equivalent, and vice versa, so confusion in the translation of these terms is quite common.

Finnish mythology
Finnish legendary creatures
Leprechaun